The Olympus OM-D E-M10 Mark III is a digital mirrorless interchangeable-lens camera released by Olympus Corporation in September 2017. 

It succeeded the Olympus OM-D E-M10 Mark II, although it did not offer much of a hardware upgrade, instead focusing on an easier photography experience.

Critics pointed out that the 16 megapixel sensor seemed dated at the time of the camera's release.

The E-M10 Mark III won a Japan Parenting Award 2017.

Differences with the Olympus OM-D E-M10 Mark II 
The Mark III uses a newer image processor TruePic VIII. It introduces 4K movie capabilities, has more autofocus points (121 instead of 81) and allows slightly faster sequential shooting.

Some software features were introduced in the Mark III, including movie editing capabilities (trimming movies and saving a selected frame of 4K videos as an image).

References

External links

OM-D E-M10 Mark III
Cameras introduced in 2017